Greig Stewart "Chubby" Jackson (October 25, 1918 – October 1, 2003) was an American jazz double-bassist and band leader.

Biography
Born in New York City, Jackson began at the age of seventeen as a clarinetist, but quickly changed to bass in the mid-1930s.

Jackson performed and/or recorded with Louis Armstrong, Raymond Scott, Jan Savitt, Henry Busse, Charlie Barnet, Oscar Pettiford, Charlie Ventura, Lionel Hampton, Bill Harris, Woody Herman, Gerry Mulligan, Lennie Tristano and others. He is perhaps best known for his spirited work both with the Herman bands, and as a leader of his own bands, big and small.

In the 1950s, Jackson worked as a studio musician, freelanced, and hosted some local children's TV shows: Chubby Jackson's Little Rascals, which was seen weekday mornings on WABC TV Ch. 7 in New York from March 23, 1959, to July 14, 1961, and The Chubby Jackson Show, Saturday afternoons also on WABC TV Ch.7, from July 22, 1961, to August 5, 1961. Jackson hosted his last two children's TV shows for WOR TV Ch.9 in New York Space Station Nine, which was seen weekday evenings from January 1, 1962, to January 26, 1962, and he briefly served as the fourth and last emcee of WOR TV's Looney Tunes Show/The Chubby Jackson Show weekday afternoons. The last series was aired from January 12, 1962, to June 14, 1962.

In 2000, Jackson was inducted into the Big Band and Jazz Hall of Fame. He died in Rancho Bernardo, California at the age of 84.

Discography

As leader
 Chubby's Back! (Argo, 1957)
 Chubby Takes Over (Everest, 1958)
 I'm Entitled to You!! (Argo, 1958)
 Jazz from Then Till Now (Everest, 1958)
 Chubby Jackson Discovers Maria Marshall (Crown, 1961)

As sideman
 Louis Armstrong, Town Hall Concert Plus (RCA Victor, 1957)
 Charlie Barnet, Cherokee (Everest, 1958)
 Bill Harris, Bill Harris Herd (Norgran, 1956)
 Woody Herman, The Herd Rides Again (Everest, 1958)
 Woody Herman, Hey! Heard the Herd? (Verve, 1963)
 Wooyd Herman, The 40th Anniversary Carnegie Hall Concert (RCA Victor, 1977)
 Jackie and Roy, Jackie and Roy (Regent, 1957)
 Marty Napoleon, Marty Napoleon and His Music (Stere-o-Craft, 1958)
 Flip Phillips, A Melody from the Sky (Bob Thiele, 1975)
 Charlie Ventura, Jumping with Ventura (EmArcy, 1955)
 Charlie Ventura, East of Suez (Regent, 1958)
 Ben Webster, Ben and the Boys Jazz Archives, 1976)

References

External links 
 Chubby and Duffy Jackson, the Only Father-and-Son Bass and Drum Team in Jazz
 Chubby Jackson: Bio
 Chubby Jackson
 The Jazz Network Worldwide.
Chubby Jackson Interview - NAMM Oral History Library (2000)

1918 births
2003 deaths
Bebop double-bassists
Swing double-bassists
American jazz double-bassists
Male double-bassists
20th-century American musicians
People from Rancho Bernardo, San Diego
20th-century double-bassists
20th-century American male musicians
American male jazz musicians
Jazz musicians from California